São Tomé Island League  is the top division of the São Toméan Football Federation for the São Tomé Island.  The champion competes at the national championships each year.

History
Before independence, it was the only regional competition in the nation.  It was the sole competition in the country and was acted as a national competition until 1985 when the Príncipe League were founded. From 1986 to 1988, 1991, 1992 and 1994 to 1997 as the other island's competitions were not held, the island champions were also national champions.

São Tomé League - Clubs 2017

First Division
 Agrosport 
 FC Aliança Nacional - Pantufo
 Bairros Unidos FC - Caixão Grande
 Correia  - Correia
 Os Dinâmicos (Porto) Folha Fede
 Inter Bom-Bom 
 Clube Desportivo de Neves  (Neves)
 Sporting Praia Cruz (Praia Cruz)
 Trindade FC
 UDRA (São João dos Angolares)
 UDESCAI (Água Izé)
 Vitória FC (Riboque)

Second Division
 6 de Setembro (Santana)
 Amador 
 Boavista FC Uba Budo
 CD Guadalupe (Guadalupe)
 Kê Morabeza (Bela Vista)
 Oque d'El Rey (Oque d'El Rei)
 Palmar  (Palmar)
 Ribeira Peixe (Ribeira Peixe)
 Santana FC (Santana)
 Sporting São Tomé

Third Division
 Andorinha Sport Club 
 Desportivo Conde 
 Cruz Vermelha (Almeirim)
 Juba Diogo Simão - withdrew
 Marítimo Micoló 
 Otótó
 Porto Alegre (Porto Alegre)
 Santa Margarida  (Santa Margarida)
 Varzim FC (Ribeira Afonso)
 Diogo Vaz

Previous winners

1977 : Vitória FC
1978 : Vitória FC
1979 : Vitória FC
1980 : Desportivo de Guadalupe
1981 : Desportivo de Guadalupe
1982 : Sporting Praia Cruz
1983 : no championship
1984 : Andorinha Sport Club
1985 : Sporting Praia Cruz
1986 : Vitória FC
1987 : no championship
1988 : 6 de Setembro
1989 : Vitória FC
1990 : 
1991 : Santana FC
1992 : no championship
1993 : 
1994 : Sporting Praia Cruz
1995 : Inter Bom-Bom
1996 : Caixão Grande
1997 : no championship
1998 : 
1999 : Sporting Praia Cruz
2000 : Inter Bom-Bom
2001 : Bairros Unidos FC
2002 : no championship
2003 : Inter Bom-Bom
2004 : UDESCAI
2005 : no championship
2006 : no championship
2007 : Sporting Praia Cruz
2008 : no championship
2009 : Vitória FC
2010 : no championship
2011 : Vitória FC
2012 : Sporting Praia Cruz
2013 : Sporting Praia Cruz
2014 : UDRA
2015 : Sporting Praia Cruz
2016 : Sporting Praia Cruz
2017 : UDRA
2018 : UDRA

Performance by club

Performance by district

References

 
2
Second level football leagues in Africa